The 1991 Internationaux de Strasbourg was a women's tennis tournament played on outdoor clay courts at the  Ligue d'Alsace de Tenis in Strasbourg, France that was part of Tier IV of the 1991 WTA Tour. It was the fifth edition of the tournament and was held from 20 May until 26 May 1991. Unseeded Radka Zrubáková won the singles title and earned $27,000 first-prize money.

Finals

Singles

 Radka Zrubáková defeated  Rachel McQuillan 7–6(7–3), 7–6(7–3)
 It was Zrubáková's 1st title of the year and the 2nd of her career.

Doubles

 Lori McNeil /  Stephanie Rehe defeated  Manon Bollegraf /  Mercedes Paz 6–7(2–7), 6–4, 6–4

References

External links
 ITF tournament edition details 
 Tournament draws

Internationaux de Strasbourg
1991
Internationaux de Strasbourg
May 1991 sports events in Europe